The Garth Brooks World Tour is a concert tour by American country music artist Garth Brooks from 1993–1994. Spanning ten countries in less than two years, it was Brooks' most travelled tour to date, and his third concert tour. It launched in support of his 1993 album, In Pieces, and visited many cities throughout North America, Europe, Oceania, and South America.

Show synopsis
Each concert began with Brooks rising from behind the drum kit, performing "Standing Outside the Fire" with fire pyrotechnics engulfing the stage. Many other special effects were used in the concert, including thunder and rain during "The Thunder Rolls", not common to more traditional country concerts. The encore performance of "Ain't Goin' Down ('Til the Sun Comes Up)", featuring Brooks flying about the venue on a specially modified trapeze mechanism, has become a staple of Brooks' live performances.

Recordings
The tour's September 24, 1993 concert at Texas Stadium in Dallas was recorded and broadcast on NBC, titled This is Garth Brooks, Too! (a follow-up to Brooks' 1992 televised concert). It was later included in Brooks' The Entertainer DVD collection, released in 2006.

Set list
The typical set for this tour was as follows (this does not represent all concerts for the duration of the series):

"Standing Outside the Fire"
"Rodeo"
"Papa Loved Mama"
"That Summer"
"American Honky-Tonk Bar Association"
"Much Too Young (To Feel This Damn Old)"
"The River"
"We Shall Be Free" 
"To All The Girls I've Loved Before"
"What She's Doing Now"
"Unanswered Prayers"
"Two of a Kind, Workin' on a Full House"
"The Thunder Rolls"
"Callin' Baton Rouge"
"Shameless"
"Friends in Low Places"
"The Dance"
Encore:
"Ain't Goin' Down ('Til the Sun Comes Up)"

Tour dates
Concert dates were announced at random, a tradition later popularized by Brooks on his other world tours. Because of this factor, no detailed list remains intact of each concert performed on Brooks' 1993–94 tour.

Personnel
 Garth Brooks – vocals, acoustic guitar, electric guitar on "Callin' Baton Rouge", alto saxophone on "One Night a Day"
 Ty England – acoustic guitar, backing vocals
 David Gant – fiddle, piano, synthesizers
 James Garver – electric guitar, electric banjo on "Callin' Baton Rouge", percussion, backing vocals
 Mark Greenwood – bass guitar, backing vocals
 Steve McClure – pedal steel guitar, electric guitar, dobro on "Callin' Baton Rouge"
 Debbie Nims – acoustic guitar, mandolin, percussion, backing vocals
 Mike Palmer – drums, percussion
 Betsy Smittle – bass guitar, acoustic guitar, backing vocals

See also
List of Garth Brooks concert tours

References

 

1993 concert tours
1994 concert tours
Garth Brooks concert tours